Leyboabazov is a rural locality (a khutor) in Zarevskoye Rural Settlement of Shovgenovsky District, the Republic of Adygea, Russia. The population was 85 as of 2018. There are 2 streets.

Geography 
Leyboabazov is located 9 km southwest of Khakurinokhabl (the district's administrative centre) by road. Doroshenko is the nearest rural locality.

References 

Rural localities in Shovgenovsky District